Han Deming (Chinese: 韩德明; born 22 July 1986) is a retired Chinese football player.

Club career
In 2004, Han Deming started his professional footballer career with Shaanxi National Power in the China League One. In February 2006, Han transferred to newly promoted China League One side Shanxi Wosen Luhu. For the next two seasons he would go on to establish himself as a vital member of their squad, however the club were in financial difficulties and dissolved at the end of the 2007 league season.

In March 2008, Han transferred to China League One side Harbin Yiteng. In his debut season with the club he would unfortunately see them relegated at the end of the 2008 China League One campaign. In the 2011 China League Two campaign he would be part of the team that won the division and promotion into the second tier. He would go on to be a member of the squad as they moved up divisions and gained promotion to the Chinese Super League. He made his Super League debut on 15 March 2014 in a 4–1 away defeat against Guangzhou Evergrande and he also scored his first Super League goal in this match.

Han transferred to another Super League club Changchun Yatai along with his teammate Shao Shuai in December 2014.  In July 2017, Han was loaned to China League Two club Shaanxi Chang'an Athletic until 31 December 2017.

Career statistics 
Statistics accurate as of match played 31 December 2020.

Honours

Club
Harbin Yiteng
 China League Two: 2011

References

External links
HAN DEMING at Soccerway.com

1986 births
Living people
Chinese footballers
Footballers from Dalian
Zhejiang Yiteng F.C. players
Changchun Yatai F.C. players
Shaanxi Chang'an Athletic F.C. players
Chinese Super League players
China League One players
Association football midfielders